Naqada may refer to:

 Naqada, a town on the west bank of the Nile River in Egypt
 Naqada culture, a material culture in Predynastic Egypt, or one of its sub-periods:

 Naqada I, also called the Amratian culture
 Naqada II, also called the Gerzeh culture
 Naqada III, also called the Protodynastic period or Semainean culture

See also
Naqadeh, Iranian town
Nakada, a Japanese surname